This is an alphabetical index of articles about aesthetics.

A - D 
- A Mathematician's Apology
- A Philosophical Enquiry into the Origin of Our Ideas of the Sublime and Beautiful
- Abhinavagupta
- Aesthetic atrophy
- Aesthetic emotions
- Aesthetic interpretation
- Aesthetic Realism
- Aesthetic realism (metaphysics)
- Aesthetic relativism
- Aestheticism
- Aestheticization of politics
- Aesthetics
- Aesthetics of music
- Affect (philosophy)
- Albert Hofstadter
- Aleksei Losev
- Alexander Gerard
- Alexander Gottlieb Baumgarten
- Alexander Nehamas
- American Society for Aesthetics
- Anandavardhana
- André Malraux
- Anti-art
- Applied aesthetics
- Architectural design values
- Aristotle
- Art
- Art and morality
- Art as Experience
- Art criticism
- Art for art's sake
- Arthur Danto
- Arthur Schopenhauer
- Arthur Schopenhauer's aesthetics
- Artistic inspiration
- August Wilhelm Schlegel
- Authenticity (philosophy)
- Authorial intent
- Avant-garde
- Avant-Garde and Kitsch
- Axiology
- Beauty
- Béla Balázs
- Benedetto Croce
- Bernhard Alexander
- British Society of Aesthetics
- Calvin Seerveld
- Camp (style)
- Carl Dahlhaus
- Catharsis
- Christopher Janaway
- Classicism
- Classificatory disputes about art
- Clive Bell
- Comedy
- Communication aesthetics
- Conceptual art
- Creativity
- Critique of Judgment
- Cultural sensibility
- David Hume
- David Prall
- The Death of the Author
- Decadence
- Depiction
- Dewitt H. Parker
- Didacticism
- Disgust
- Distancing effect
- Ecstasy (emotion)
- Ecstasy (philosophy)
- Edmund Burke
- Eduard Hanslick
- Edward Bullough
- Either/Or
- Elegance
- Eli Siegel
- Encyclopedia of Aesthetics
- Entertainment
- Eroticism
- Essentialism
- Essentially contested concept

F - L 
- Fact-value distinction
- Ferdinand Gotthelf Hand
- Ferruccio Busoni
- Fine art
- Form follows function
- Formalism (art)
- Formalism (philosophy)
- Found object
- Four Dissertations
- Francesco de Sanctis
- Francis Hutcheson (philosopher)
- François Hemsterhuis
- Frank Sibley (philosopher)
- Friedrich Nietzsche
- Friedrich Schiller
- Friedrich Schlegel
- Georg Anton Friedrich Ast
- Georg Brandes
- Georg Friedrich Meier
- Georg Mehlis
- Georg Wilhelm Friedrich Hegel
- George Dickie (philosopher)
- George Lansing Raymond
- George Santayana
- Georges Bataille
- Gotthold Ephraim Lessing
- Gregory Currie
- Grotesque body
- Guy Sircello
- Heinrich Gustav Hotho
- Hermann Theodor Hettner
- Hippias Major
- Historicism
- History of aesthetics
- Humour
- Iki (aesthetic ideal)
- Immanuel Kant
- Inherently funny word
- International Association of Empirical Aesthetics
- Irrealism (philosophy)
- Jacques Derrida
- Jacques Maritain
- Jan Mukařovský
- Japanese aesthetics
- Jean-Baptiste Dubos
- Jean-François Lyotard
- Jerrold Levinson
- Jo-ha-kyū
- Johann Friedrich Herbart
- Johann Gottfried Herder
- John Dewey
- John Hospers
- José María Valverde
- Joseph Margolis
- Journal of Aesthetics and Art Criticism
- Józef Kremer
- Judgement
- Karl Wilhelm Ferdinand Solger
- Kendall Walton
- Kitsch
- Kunstreligion
- Lectures on Aesthetics
- Leo Tolstoy
- Leonid Stolovich
- Life imitating art
- Line of beauty
- List of aestheticians
- List of art movements
- List of culturally linked qualities of music
- List of French artistic movements
- List of Stuckist artists
- Literary criticism
- Liu Xie

M - R 
- Madeleine Doran
- Magnificence (History of ideas)
- Martin Foss
- Martin Heidegger
- Marxist aesthetics
- Masakazu Nakai
- Mathematical beauty
- Maurice Blanchot
- Max Black
- Metaphor in philosophy
- Michael Sprinker
- Mikhail Bakhtin
- Milan Damnjanović (philosopher)
- Mimesis
- Miyabi
- Modernism
- Monroe Beardsley
- Morris Weitz
- Music
- Musicology
- Nelson Goodman
- Neo-romanticism
- Neuroesthetics
- Noël Carroll
- Notes on "Camp"
- Novalis
- Objectivism
- Observations on the Feeling of the Beautiful and Sublime
- On the Genealogy of Morality
- On the Sublime
- Oscar Wilde
- Outline of aesthetics
- Paragone
- Paul de Man
- Perception
- Performing arts
- Philistinism
- Philosophy and Literature (journal)
- Philosophy and literature
- Philosophy in a New Key
- Philosophy of design
- Philosophy of film
- Philosophy of music
- Phonaesthetics
- Poetics
- Poetics (Aristotle)
- Poetry
- Poshlost
- Psychical distance
- R. G. Collingwood
- Rachida Triki
- Rasa (aesthetics)
- Relational Art
- René Huyghe
- Representation (arts)
- Rhetoric (Aristotle)
- Rhyme
- Richard Meltzer
- Richard Shusterman
- Richard Wollheim
- Roger de Piles
- Roger North (17th century)
- Roger Scruton
- Roland Barthes
- Roman Ingarden
- Romanticism
- Ronald Paulson
- Rotation method
- Rudolf Arnheim

S - Z 
- Semiotics
- Sexual attraction
- Sexual selection
- Sexual selection in human evolution
- Shibui
- Social realism
- Socialist realism
- Sociological art
- Sociology of art
- Sophistication
- Søren Kierkegaard
- Sound poetry
- Sound symbolism
- Stanley Cavell
- Stephen Pepper
- Style (visual arts)
- Sublime (philosophy)
- Susanne Langer
- Symbolism (arts)
- Symposium (Plato)
- Taruho Inagaki
- Tasos Zembylas
- Taste (sociology)
- The Aesthetic Dimension
- The Analysis of Beauty
- The Art Movements
- The arts and politics
- The Book of Tea
- The Critic as Artist
- The Literary Mind and the Carving of Dragons
- The medium is the message
- The Origin of the Work of Art
- The Romantic Manifesto
- The Work of Art in the Age of Mechanical Reproduction
- Theodor Lipps
- Theodor Mundt
- Theodor W. Adorno
- Theological aesthetics
- Theories of humor
- Thomas Munro
- Thomas Reid
- Tomonubu Imamichi
- Tudor Vianu
- Umberto Eco
- Vernon Lee
- Victor Cousin
- Virgil Aldrich
- Vissarion Belinsky
- Visual literacy
- Visual rhetoric
- Vulgarity
- Wabi-sabi
- Walter Benjamin
- Walter Pater
- Warren Shibles
- What Is Art?
- Wiener Moderne
- William Kurtz Wimsatt, Jr.
- Władysław Tatarkiewicz
- Wolfgang Fritz Haug
- Work of art
- Xiaozi
- Yabo
- Yiannis Psychopedis
- Yusuf Balasaghuni
- Zeami Motokiyo

See also
 Philosophy

Aesthetics